Oneiroid syndrome (OS) is a condition involving dream-like disturbances of one's consciousness by vivid scenic hallucinations, accompanied by catatonic symptoms (either catatonic stupor or excitement), delusions, or psychopathological experiences of a kaleidoscopic nature. The term is from Ancient Greek "ὄνειρος" (óneiros, meaning "dream") and "εἶδος" (eîdos, meaning "form, likeness"; literally dream-like / oneiric or oniric, sometimes called "nightmare-like"). It is a common complication of catatonic schizophrenia, although it can also be caused by other mental disorders. The dream-like experiences are vivid enough to seem real to the patient. OS is distinguished from delirium by the fact that the imaginative experiences of patients always have an internal projection. This syndrome is hardly mentioned in standard psychiatric textbooks, possibly because it is not listed in DSM.

History 

The German physician Wilhelm Mayer-Gross first described oneiroid states in 1924. Mayer-Gross's 1924 dissertation "Self-descriptions of Confusional States: the Oneiroid Form of Experience" is considered to be the first monograph discussing oneiroid states. It is the psychopathological method (known to German psychiatrists as the "phenomenological method" – phänomenologische Methode).

Use of term 
The term "oneiroid syndrome", while generally known to European and Russian psychiatrists, remains largely unfamiliar in the United States.

ICD-9 adapted for the Soviet Union 
Included in the 9th edition of Manual of the International Statistical Classification of Diseases, Injuries, and Causes of Death, adapted for the USSR (ICD-9, 1983), were two diagnoses of oneiroid states in section  (catatonic schizophrenia):
 ICD-9 code 295.24: oneiroid catatonia as a variant of shiftlike progressive schizophrenia;
 ICD-9 code 295.25: oneiroid catatonia as a variant of recurrent schizophrenia.

According to Soviet psychiatric research, oneiroid syndrome occurs alongside catatonic schizophrenia in the great majority of cases. The catatonic phenomena in catatonic schizophrenia (code ) may be combined with oneiroid syndrome, as it is written in the current version of the ICD-10.

Clinical characteristics 
Oneiroid syndrome is characterized by the extraordinary and fantastical nature of its psychotic experiences. Characteristic to the condition are mixed feelings, conflicted thoughts, contradictory experiences and actions, a sense of dramatic changes in the world, and simultaneous feelings of triumph and catastrophe. Oneiroid syndrome is often accompanied by frequent hallucinations and pseudohallucinations, as well as visual illusions. Patients do not identify the perceived phenomena as belonging to the real world, but rather as belonging to other realms or spheres, which cannot be observed or accessed by ordinary people. Patients often participate mentally in narratives of considerable detail and drama, sometimes with the ability to observe themselves from the outside. Their actual behavior, however, does not typically reflect the richness of their experience at the time in which it is occurring.

A patient with oneiroid syndrome will often experience unusual and colourful pseudohallucinations. The environment may be perceived as having been specially set as for a show. Some patients in an oneiroid state might believe that during such an experience their lives are staged shows; in this case it is similar to the Truman Show delusion.

There is often disorientation regarding place and time, as well as a double-awareness of oneself: a patient might be aware simultaneously that he or she is in the hospital, as well as a participant in a fantastical narrative. Individuals surrounding the patient may also be perceived by the patient as being participants in the same narrative, and might be regarded as either friendly or hostile.

The behavior of a patient who is in an oneiroid state sharply contrasts with his or her fantastic pseudohallucinatory symptoms – patients usually lie motionless in bed, with closed eyes, sometimes making "smooth flying" movements with their hands, watching their fantastic adventures as if from the outside. Patients often experience distortions of time of immense proportions: for example, a patient may report that he or she has been flying for several light years, and that during that time, he or she died several times and was raised from the dead by cloning, with each of the clones living for several hundred years. Sometimes, patients do not lie on their bed, but instead wander thoughtfully through the mental institution with an "enchanted smile," withdrawn into themselves. At times, they are capable of directly reporting their fantastical experiences. At their height, single catatonic symptoms can appear in the form of, for example, catalepsy or sub-stupor. The themes of oneiroid experience are derived from the patient's own experiences, from books, fantasy, or films of appropriate content (probably, that is why the story of the experiences is different for all).

Catatonic disorder due to oneiroid syndrome 
Catatonic stupor can be accompanied by a clear consciousness – lucid catatonia – or with a disorder of consciousness – oneiroid catatonia. Oneiroid catatonia combines with dream-like experiences, and a patient only communicates with people after the end of the episode of stupor (contact with a patient actively experiencing oneiroid catatonia is often very difficult and useless).

Patient's movements often become restricted, becoming catatonic for a short period: stereotypies – body-rocking, head banging, mutism, negativism (failure to cooperate or the active subversion of demands made of the patient), waxy flexibility, impulsive actions. Sometimes the patient's speech is completely incoherent, but sometimes they are able to answer questions, offering an opportunity for a physician to identify the nature of the patient's disorientation. Patients can be disoriented not only with respect to place and time, but also can be disoriented with respect to themselves and their own personality.

Oneiroid syndrome most often occurs as the manifestation of an acute episode of schizophrenia. The duration of the oneiroid period is limited to a few weeks or days. The first signs of the beginning of a psychotic episode are sleep disorders and a growing sense of anxiety. The patient's concerns quickly reaches a level of total bewilderment. Vivid emotions and the phenomena of derealization serves as the basis for fragmentary, unsystematized delusions (acute picturesque delusion).

The initial fear is soon replaced by an affect of amazement or sheer ecstasy. Patients quiet down, looking around with a keen interest in their surroundings, and become excited by colors and sounds. Later, patients develop catatonic stupor or catatonic agitation. The duration of the oneiroid episode is different from patient to patient. Often, spontaneous recovery occurs within a few weeks of onset. The termination of the psychosis is gradual: hallucinations disappear very quickly, but catatonic phenomena and irregular behavior sometimes persist for a long time. After the end of the psychosis, patient can describe some fragments of their psychopathological experiences, but this story is usually inconsistent.

An oneiroid-schizophrenic state also can be induced by the Kandinsky-Clérambault syndrome. This is typical for people with paranoid schizophrenia who also suffer from the oneiroid syndrome.

After leaving the oneiroid state, the patient may remember their fantastic experiences, but suffer amnesia about the real events that occurred in his life during this psychotic episode. Residual delusion may persist for a few days afterward.

Prognosis 
Oneiroid catatonia is one of the most favorable schizophrenic psychoses, it poses minimal complications in the aftermath of an episode, and a patient can undergo treatment and recover without significant personality changes.

Lethal catatonia 
During extremely strong breaks of consciousness, a patient may very rarely develop hyperthermia, accompanied by an increasing cerebral edema and impaired cardiac activity (known as "febrile schizophrenia" in Russia and "lethal catatonia" in the west). The immediate initiation of intensive therapy can now save most of these patients.

The use of antipsychotics in lethal catatonia is considered ineffective and very dangerous. Instead, psychiatrists recommend the use of benzodiazepines, symptomatic therapy, as well as dantrolene, bromocriptine, ketamine and amantadine for treatments of this condition.

Causes 
The exact causes of oneiroid syndrome are unknown. However, it is pathologically connected to the following conditions:
 Endogenous diseases: schizophrenia (especially catatonic schizophrenia).
 Exogenous organic diseases: infectious (encephalitis), intoxication (by hallucinogens, for example), traumatic brain injury, epilepsy, delirium tremens.

Most often, this pathology is noted in schizophrenia (oneiroid catatonia), but sometimes it is described with organic brain lesions and intoxications.

There is no self-consciousness disorder in oneiroid syndrome with exogenous diseases. There are no catatonia phenomena, and the syndrome ends more rapidly. Oneiroid syndrome in exogenous organic diseases is evidence of a severe deterioration in the patient's response to the organic disease, and its transition to amential syndrome or mental fog is an even more unfavorable symptom.

Exogenous organic oneiroid is different from schizophrenic oneiroid. In most cases, the described exogenous psychoses occupy an intermediate position between delirium and oneiroid, with a rapid and dynamic development of symptoms and an increase in psychotic symptoms occurring during the evening (as is typical for delirium). Clinical resolution of such psychoses after deep sleep also points to a case of delirium. All of this allows us to relate these diagnostic categories to have the variants of delirium ("fantastic delirium"). Hallucinogens (LSD, hashish, ketamine) and hormonal preparations (for example, corticosteroids) may cause exogenous oneiroid syndrome.

Stages of the oneiroid syndrome 
Later in 1961 the Bulgarian psychiatrist S. T. Stoianov studied the dynamics and the course of the oneiroid syndrome in "periodic", or recurrent schizophrenia. In the ICD-9 was a diagnosis : recurrent schizophrenia without other specifications (also known as periodic schizophrenia or circular schizophrenia). It was deleted from the ICD-10. In the DSM-5 there is no such diagnosis, either.

According to this research the syndrome has six stages in its course:
 initial general-somatic and vegetative disorder
 delusional mood
 affective-delusional depersonalisation and derealisation
 fantastic-delusional and affective depersonalisation and derealisation
 illusional depersonalisation and derealisation, and
 catatonic-oneiroid state in the culmination.

Electroencephalography 
In most of the cases of the oneiroid syndrome, there were crude pathological changes in the electroencephalography (EEG).

See also 
 Clouding of consciousness
 Delirium

References

Further reading 
 
 

Schizophrenia
Psychopathological syndromes